Free is the fourth album and first live recording from American contemporary gospel singer Kierra Sheard. It was released October 18,  2011 by Karew Records, under exclusive license to EMI Gospel. 
Originally scheduled for a July 12, 2011 release, the album was leaked and subsequently pushed back and reformatted with a different track listing. The album features Sheard's BRL Choir (Bold Right Life) Choir.

Reviews 
"Kierra Sheard's Free features a mix of studio and live-in-Chicago material with a full band and her BRL Choir, all produced by her brother, J. Drew Sheard II. It’s Sheard’s boldest and most diverse album yet. There are the expected modern contemporary gospel sounds, while a few songs incorporate other styles, including pop-R&B (à la Bold Right Life's “Wave Your Banner”), dance-pop, and even hard rock, with remarkable ease and power. This would not be so effective if Sheard wasn’t in top, hefty-yet-flexible form." - Andy Kellman, AllMusic

Track listing 
 "Intro (I Am Free)"
 "WAR"
 "Mighty"
 "You Are"
 "Interlude"
 "Desire"
 "Free"
 "Indescribable"
 "People (featuring S.O.M.)"
 "Victory (featuring James Fortune)"
 "Believers Evolved"
 "Back 2 Earth"
 "Lane (featuring JDS)"
 "Since I Found Christ (featuring Mali Music & JDS)"
 “Ready To Go (iTunes Exclusive)”

Charts

Weekly charts

Year-end charts

References 

Kierra Sheard albums
2011 albums